NGC 3021 is a spiral galaxy in the northern constellation of Leo Minor. This galaxy was discovered December 7, 1785 by Anglo-German astronomer William Herschel. The morphological classification of NGC 3021 is SA(rs)bc, which indicates a spiral galaxy with no central bar (SA), an incomplete inner ring structure (rs), and moderate to loosely wound spiral arms (bc).

On November 1, 1995, S. Pesci and P. Mazza in Milan, Italy reported the discovery of a supernova in the NGC 3021 galaxy. G. M. Hurst in England confirmed the finding, estimating the magnitude at 13.2. The spectrum matched a type Ia supernova and was found to be similar to SN 1981b near maximum. On 18 February 2023, a second supernova appeared in this galaxy: SN 2023bvj (Type II, mag. 17).

References

External links 
 

Unbarred spiral galaxies
Leo Minor
3021
05280
28357